The Melting Pot is a British television situation comedy starring Spike Milligan. It was written by Milligan and his regular collaborator Neil Shand. The pilot episode was broadcast only once on BBC1 in June 1976, with a full series recorded the following August but never broadcast.

Milligan played Mr. Van Gogh  (in brownface) alongside John Bird as Mr. Rembrandt, father and son illegal Asian immigrants who are first seen being rowed ashore in England, having been told that the beach is in fact Piccadilly Circus. They hitch a ride to London in a lorry advertising Italian-made Yorkshire puddings, and find themselves at a boarding house in the fictional Piles Road, London WC2, run by Irish coalman Paddy O'Brien (Frank Carson) and his voluptuous daughter Nefertiti. The rest of the tenants include a black Yorkshireman, a Chinese cockney and a Scottish Arab. The "Melting Pot" of the title refers to the district of London where they have arrived.

The pilot episode, produced by Roger Race, was broadcast on BBC1 at 9:25 pm on 11 June 1976, and was followed by a recording of a full series of six episodes the following August. Roger Race was replaced as director by Ian McNaughton, who had previously worked on Milligan's Q5 and Q6 series. However, the series was never transmitted. Milligan speculated that the programmes were perhaps insufficiently funny, or that cast changes made following the pilot episode had been an unwise decision. However, the popular consensus seems to be that the BBC disliked the racially insensitive nature of the series as a whole. A book of the scripts of the series was published in 1983 by Robson Books, with illustrations by the cartoonist Bill Tidy, and Milligan later reused some of the situations and characters in his 1987 comic novel The Looney. The pilot episode remains in the BBC's archives in the form of a  low-band U-matic video recording, while the seven-episode series was preserved on the original broadcast standard video tape.

Cast
Spike Milligan as Mr Van Gogh: an illegal Pakistani immigrant
John Bird as Mr Rembrandt: Van Gogh's son, also an illegal immigrant
Frank Carson as Paddy O'Brien: an Irish Republican landlord and coalman
Alexandra Dane as Nefertiti Skupinski: O'Brien's voluptuous, South African-bred daughter
Wayne Brown as Luigi O'Reilly: a black Yorkshireman
Harry Fowler as Eric Lee Fung: a Chinese cockney spiv
John Bluthal as Richard Armitage: an Orthodox London Jew
Anthony Brothers as Sheik Yamani: an Orthodox Arab who speaks with a Scots accent as he's been learning banking at the Bank of Scotland, Peckham
Robert Dorning as Colonel Grope: an ex-Indian Army, alcoholic racialist
Bill Kerr as Bluey Notts: an Australian bookie's clerk, a crude racialist

See also 
List of television series canceled after one episode
List of sitcoms notable for negative reception

References

External links

BBC television sitcoms
1970s British sitcoms
1975 British television series debuts
1975 British television series endings
Television shows set in London
English-language television shows